Gdańsk Pomerania) is a geographical region within Pomerelia in northern and northwestern Poland, covering the bulk of Pomeranian Voivodeship. 

It forms a part and the bulk of Pomerelia, also known as Vistula Pomerania, Eastern Pomerania, and previously Polish Pomerania; however, in contrast to the latter terms, it does not cover the historical areas of Chełmno Land and Michałów Land, sometimes with the addition of Lubawa Land.

It has traditionally been divided into Kashubia, Kociewie and Tuchola Forest regions. The Lauenburg and Bütow Land is considered by the Polish historiography a part of Kashubia (and thus Gdansk Pomerania), while German historiography tends to treat it as a part of Farther Pomerania. Gdansk Pomerania has been inhabited by ethnic Kashubians, Kociewians and Borowians, respectively.

Name
In Polish language, the area was called  ('Pomerania') since the Middle Ages. In the early 14th century the Teutonic Knights invaded and annexed the region from Poland into their monastic state, which already included historical Prussia, located east of the region. As a result of the Teutonic rule, in German terminology the name of Prussia was also extended to annexed Polish lands like Vistula/Eastern Pomerania, although it was never inhabited by Baltic Prussians but by the Slavic Poles. 

After the area was reintegrated with Poland in 1466 both names were in use: Pomerania was used when referring to the Pomeranian Voivodeship (Gdansk Pomerania) and Chełmno Voivodeship, while Royal Prussia was used as the name of the wider province, which, however, also included the Malbork Voivodeship and the Prince-Bishopric of Warmia, covering the Prussian historical areas of Pomesania, Pogesania and Warmia. After the Partitions of Poland, the area was annexed by the Kingdom of Prussia and formed part of the newly established province of West Prussia, and the name Pomerania was not used by Prussian or German authorities in relation to this region.

Following World War I and Poland's independence, much of this area became part of the new Second Polish Republic and was organized into the Pomeranian Voivodeship. After World War II, Poland gained the remainder of the area including the city of Gdańsk.

Population
The indigenous population of the area are the Slavic Kashubians, who speak the Kashubian dialect of the Pomeranian language, as well as the Kociewiacy and the Borowiacy speaking the Greater Polish dialects of Polish. The Kashubians are organized in the Kashubian-Pomeranian Association.

Cities and towns

Biały Bór
Brusy
Bytów
Chojnice
Czarna Woda
Czarne
Czersk
Człuchów
Debrzno
Gdańsk
Gdynia
Gniew
Hel
Jastarnia
Kartuzy
Kościerzyna
Krynica Morska
Lębork
Łeba
Nowe
Pelplin
Pruszcz Gdański
Puck
Reda
Rumia
Skarszewy
Skórcz
Sopot
Starogard Gdański
Świecie
Tczew
Tuchola
Wejherowo
Władysławowo
Żukowo

See also
 History of Pomerania
 History of Gdańsk
 Eastern Pomerania (disambiguation)
 Dukes of Pomerania
 Royal Prussia
 West Prussia
 Pomeranian Voivodship

References

Regions of Poland